Alastor promontorii is a species of wasp in the family Vespidae.

References

promontorii
Insects described in 1913